The Angers European First Film Festival is an annual film festival held in the city of Angers, France every January since 1989, dedicated to European cinema.

History

The first edition of this festival took place in 1989 at the initiative of its current delegate general , founder of the art house cinema Les 400 coups in Angers, and of a group of moviegoers. 

Since 2011 , the festival collaborates with the Beijing First Film Festival. 

In 2013, it attracted nearly  festival-goers.

Jury Presidents

Over the years, seminal figures in the world of cinematography have chaired the jury:

 1989 : Theo Angelopoulos
 1990 : Henri Alekan
 1991 : Vojtěch Jasný
 1992 : André Téchiné
 1993 : Jane Birkin
 1994 : Andrzej Żuławski
 1995 : Bertrand Tavernier
 1996 : Freddy Buache
 1997 : Agnieszka Holland
 1998 : Claude Chabrol
 1999 : Lucian Pintilie
 2000 : Agnès Varda
 2001 : 
 2002 : Nathalie Baye
 2003 : Jeanne Moreau
 2004 : Benoît Jacquot
 2005 : Jacqueline Bisset and Claude Miller
 2006 : Radu Mihaileanu
 2007 : Abderrahmane Sissako
 2008 : Sandrine Bonnaire
 2009 : Claire Denis and Raoul Servais
 2010 : Lucas Belvaux and 
 2011 : Robert Guédiguian and Tonie Marshall
 2012 : Christophe Honoré and Mathieu Demy
 2013 : Noémie Lvovsky and  
 2014 : Catherine Corsini
 2015 : Laurent Cantet and Jiri Barta
 2017 : Lambert Wilson
 2018 : Catherine Deneuve
 2019 : Cédric Kahn and Michael Dudok de Wit
 2020 : Juliette Binoche and Claude Barras
 2021 : Pierre Salvadori

References

External links

Premiers Angers at the Internet Movie Database
Premies Angers at FestAgent

1989 establishments in France
Film festivals in France
Film festivals established in 1989